David Hitchcock may refer to:
 David Hitchcock (comics), English comics writer and artist
 D. Howard Hitchcock (1861–1943), American/Hawaiian painter
 Dave Hitchcock, former record producer